The Princess of Wales Hospital is a healthcare facility in Ely, Cambridgeshire. It is managed by the Cambridgeshire and Peterborough NHS Foundation Trust.

History
The facility was established as the Royal Air Force Hospital Ely in 1939. It treated military casualties during the Second World War. It joined the National Health Service in 1948 and, following a visit by the Princess of Wales in 1987, it was renamed the Princess of Wales Royal Air Force Hospital. Despite a decision by the Royal Air Force to close the facility in 1992, it was saved from closure as a result of pressure from Action for a Community Hospital in Ely, a local pressure group. It was subsequently managed on a civilian basis and renamed the Princess of Wales Hospital.

References

External links
Official site

Hospital buildings completed in 1939
Hospitals in Cambridgeshire
Hospitals established in 1939
1939 establishments in England
Ely, Cambridgeshire
NHS hospitals in England